The Grant Meteorite is a meteorite that was discovered in the Zuni Mountains, about  south of Grants, New Mexico (for which it was named).   It was unearthed in 1929 although the date of its original groundfall is unknown.

After discovery, the meteorite was sold to the Smithsonian Institution. It has since been used in a wide variety of scientific studies.

See also
 Glossary of meteoritics

References

Meteorites found in the United States
Geology of New Mexico